A Little Deeper is the debut studio album by English singer and rapper Ms. Dynamite. It was released on 10 June 2002 by Polydor Records. The album won the Mercury Prize in 2002. As of September 2011, it had sold 495,000 copies in the United Kingdom.

Reception

The album was included in the book 1001 Albums You Must Hear Before You Die.

Track listing

Track 13 is a bonus track on some editions, and does not appear on the UK edition.

Charts

Weekly charts

Year-end charts

Certifications

References

2003 debut albums
Albums produced by Bloodshy & Avant
Albums produced by Salaam Remi
Mercury Prize-winning albums
Ms. Dynamite albums
Interscope Records albums